Khama Billiat (born 19 August 1990) is a Zimbabwean professional footballer who plays as a midfielder for South African Premier Division club Kaizer Chiefs.

Club career

CAPS United FC
Billiat first played for CAPS United FC under coach Lloyd Chitembwe in 2010. He featured for only 15 minutes at Rufaro Stadium, before migrating to South Africa. His stint at the Harare giants, lasted 3 months.

Ajax Cape Town
Billiat made his professional debut for Ajax Cape Town on 20 August 2010 against Mamelodi Sundowns, winning (4–3) on penalties after a 1–1 draw, in a quarterfinal match of the 2010 MTN 8 tournament at Athlone Stadium in Cape Town. He was acquired by Ajax Cape Town in the summer of 2010 as a transfer from Zimbabwean club CAPS United, only 3 months after the club had recruited him from Aces Youth Soccer Academy in Harare. Billiat was joined at Ajax CT

by CAPS club mate Grándsunny JR, who had also transferred to the Cape club.

On 21 July 2012, in a friendly encounter during the off season, Ajax Cape Town held the visiting Manchester United to a 1–1 draw in which Billiat received high praise from Manchester United defender Rio Ferdinand. Ferdinand labelled the young attacking midfielder as an agile and exciting player to watch, with great speed and ball control. His performance's for Ajax Cape Town earned him a move to Mamelodi Sundowns

Mamelodi Sundowns
Despite a trial with Lokomotiv Moscow in July 2013, Billiat joined Mamelodi Sundowns on 19 August 2013 on a five-year contract. He made his Sundowns debut on 28 August in a 1–1 draw versus Platinum Stars, while his first goal for the club came almost a month later in a 2–1 home victory against Bidvest Wits.
In 2016, he helped Mamelodi Sundowns claim their first ever continental title and becoming only the second South African team to be crowned champions of Africa. On 21 November 2017, Billiat scored a brace against Bidvest Wits.

Kaizer Chiefs
In June 2018, it was announced that Billiat was moving from Mamelodi Sundowns to Kaizer, few days later it was announced that Billiat had signed for Kaizer Chiefs on a three-year deal. He made his competitive debut for the club on 4 August 2018 in a 1-1 league draw with his former club, Mamelodi Sundowns.

International career 
Billiat has represented Zimbabwe on various youth levels. Since then, he has seen several appearances with the Zimbabwe national team during the 2012 Africa Cup of Nations qualifying matches and various friendly matches scheduled, becoming a regular starter in the attacking midfield for the Warriors. His senior debut came in a 2012 Africa Cup of Nations qualifier against Mali on 26 March 2011. Later that year, in August, Billiat scored his first goal for Zimbabwe in a friendly match versus Zambia. Billiat also played for the Zimbabwean national team at the 2017 edition of the African Cup of Nations.

In November 2021, Billiat was named captain of Zimbabwe against South Africa in 2022 FIFA World Cup qualification. And he retired from international football after his last match against Ethiopia in the FIFA world cup qualifiers 2022

Career statistics

Club
.

1 Includes CAF Champions League, CAF Confederation Cup and CAF Super Cup matches.

2 Includes Telkom Knockout and MTN 8 matches.

International
.

International goals
Scores and results list Zimbabwe's goal tally first.

Honours

Club
Mamelodi Sundowns
 Premier Soccer League (3 ): 2013–14, 2015–162017–18
 Nedbank Cup (1): 2014–15
 Telkom Knockout (1): 2015
 CAF Champions League: 2016
 CAF Super Cup: 2017

Individual
 PSL Player of the Season: 2016
 PSL Players' Player of the Season: 2016
 PSL Midfielder of the Season: 2016

References

External links

1990 births
Association football forwards
Association football midfielders
Living people
Cape Town Spurs F.C. players
Mamelodi Sundowns F.C. players
Zimbabwean footballers
Zimbabwean expatriate footballers
Zimbabwean expatriate sportspeople in South Africa
Expatriate soccer players in South Africa
Zimbabwe international footballers
Sportspeople from Harare
CAPS United players
2017 Africa Cup of Nations players
2019 Africa Cup of Nations players
Kaizer Chiefs F.C. players